James Connor (born 28 November 1938) is an English former amateur footballer who played on the left wing for Darlington in the Football League. He made his debut on 11 September 1965, in a 2–1 defeat away to Port Vale in the Fourth Division, and also played in the next two matches. He previously played non-league football for Stanley United.

References

1938 births
Living people
Footballers from Sunderland
English footballers
Association football wingers
Stanley United F.C. players
Darlington F.C. players
English Football League players